Renukoot railway station is a small railway station in Sonbhadra district, Uttar Pradesh. Its code is RNQ. It serves Renukoot town. The station consists of two platforms. The platforms are well sheltered. It is well equipped with water and sanitation. The station is connected to major cities like Delhi, Kolkata, Lucknow, Jammu, Ranchi, Patna, Jabalpur, and Bhopal.

Trains 

Some of the trains that runs from Renukoot are:
 Jharkhand Swarna Jayanti Express
 Ranchi - New Delhi Rajdhani Express
 Shaktipunj Express
 Sambalpur-Jammu Tawi Express
 Singrauli-Patna Express
 Bhopal–Howrah Weekly Express
 Ajmer–Kolkata Express
 Ranchi-Chopan Express
 Triveni Link Express

References

Railway stations in Sonbhadra district
Dhanbad railway division
Renukoot